Platt College San Diego (PCSD) is a private Digital Media Design college in San Diego, California. Family owned and operated, Platt College San Diego offers degree programs in Graphic Design, 3D Modeling & Design, Digital Filmmaking & Special Effects, and Web Design & Development and is accredited by the Accrediting Commission of Career Schools and Colleges (ACCSC).

History

 1879 - First Platt College was founded and traces its origin to St. Joseph, Missouri.
 1980 - Platt College San Diego campus was opened and originally offered Drafting, Floral Design, Travel & Tourism, and Production Art.
 1985 - It ceased its affiliation with the Missouri school in 1985 and reimagined the curriculum to meet the future needs in Digital Media Design. Curriculum developed by Jack Davis (Co-author of the award-winning "Photoshop Wow" book series and Inductee to the Photoshop Hall of Fame.) the new programs included, Production Art, Traditional & Computer Graphic Design, Multimedia, and Specialized Multimedia Diploma programs.
 1995 - Associate of Applied Science Degrees were added.
 2002 - Bachelor of Science Degrees in Media Arts (emphasis in 3D Modeling & Design, Digital Filmmaking & FX, and Web Design & Development.
 2003 - Platt College San Diego expanded its facilities due to the increasing number of interest within the field of digital media design. Thus leading to an all campus expansion, ranging from improving administration offices and building a brand new on-campus library.
 2003 - Present - Per an Advisory Board made up of industry professionals in their given fields, Platt College San Diego continuously updates the curriculum to stay current with new technologies and processes utilized in today's .

Academics

Digital Filmmaking and Special Effects programs 

 Bachelor of Science degree in Media Arts (emphasis in Digital Filmmaking and Special Effects) focuses on the independent filmmakers and content creators.
 Advanced Specialized Diploma in Digital Filmmaking and Special Effects.
 Professional Development courses: Intro to Digital Video Production, Scriptwriting, Audio Design and Engineering, Introduction to Special Effects, Intermediate to Special Effect, Introduction to Production, Intermediate Production, and Director's Reel.

3D Modeling and Design programs 

 Bachelor of Science in Media Arts (emphasis in 3D Modeling & Design) focuses on 3D Modeling, UV Mapping, Texturing, Lighting, and Rendering.

Web Design and Development programs 

 Bachelor of Science in Media Arts (emphasis in Web Design & Development) focuses on UI/UX Design, HTML, CSS, JavaScript, Dom Scripting, Wordpress, PHP, and MySQL.

Graphic Design programs 

 Associate of Applied Science degree in Graphic Design focuses on Branding, Typography, Design Basics, Digital Production, Raster Graphics (Adobe Photoshop), Vector Graphics (Adobe Illustrator) and Page Layout (Adobe InDesign).

Campus

Alumni

References

External links 
 Official website

Art schools in California
Film schools in California
Universities and colleges in San Diego
Private universities and colleges in California